Soufiane Karkache (born 2 July 1999) is a Belgian-Moroccan footballer who plays for Wydad AC.

Early years
Born in Brussels, Soufiane grew up in Molenbeek-Saint-Jean with his Moroccan parents from Oujda. His father, Abdelaziz Kerkache is a former football player and later manager, who played in Belgium. Soufiane joined the RWDM Brussels, formerly known as Efj Molenbeek, at a very young age before joining the Union Saint-Gilloise, and then Anderlecht.

Club career

Club Brugge
Karkache joined Club Brugge in 2015. During his time at Brugge, Karkache attracted interest from a lot of clubs, including LOSC Lille and West Bromwich Albion.

Morocco
For personal reasons, Karkache left Belgium and moved father's hometown, Oujda, where he grew up. He signed with MC Oujda, where his father, Abdelaziz, at the time was the head coach of. Despite interest from two clubs at the end of the 2018-19 season, both from Ligue 1 and the Belgian First Division A, Karkache decided to stay in Morocco and joined RS Berkane.

At the end of December 2019, he signed with Wydad AC.

References

External links

1999 births
Moroccan footballers
Belgian footballers
Association football defenders
R.W.D.M. Brussels F.C. players
Royale Union Saint-Gilloise players
R.S.C. Anderlecht players
Club Brugge KV players
MC Oujda players
RS Berkane players
Wydad AC players
Botola players
Living people